Shuy or Shavi or Shevi, with multiple other Romanizations, may refer to:
Band-e Shuy, village in the Bamyan Province, Afghanistan
Shavi, Dezful (شوي - Shavī), Khuzestan Province
Shavi, Shadegan (شاوي - Shāvī), Khuzestan Province
Shuy, Kurdistan (شوي)
Shuy, Razavi Khorasan (شوي)
Shuy Rural District, in Kurdistan Province

See also
Roger Shuy, American linguist